C.D. Aguán was a football club in Olanchito, Honduras.

It was one of two prominent football clubs in Olanchito in the 1930s and early 1940s.

Ramón Amaya Amador wrote the 'Hymn of C.D. Aguán'.

References

Defunct football clubs in Honduras